Martin Allen Shefter (born 1943) is an American political scientist and author who is a Professor Emeritus in the department of Government at Cornell University. He is noted for his research on New York City politics and on how changes in the international system shape political institutions and the conduct of politics in the United States.

Biography 
Shefter graduated with a B.A. in government from Cornell University in 1964 and completed his PhD degree at Harvard University in 1970. His doctoral dissertation examined "City Hall and State House: State Legislative Involvement in the Politics of New York City and Boston."

Shefter taught political science at Harvard, Cornell, and the University of Chicago, before returning to Cornell in 1986. Shefter teaches urban politics, political parties and movements, and American political development.

Shefter is a member (since 1995) of the executive committee of the Politics and History Section of the American Political Science Association and served as president of the section for 1996–97.

Select Publications
Patronage and its Opponents: A Theory and Some European Cases. 1977. Cornell University.
Political Crisis, Fiscal Crisis: The Collapse and Revival of New York City. 1985. Basic Books.
Politics By Other Means: Politicians, Prosecutors, and the Press from Watergate to Whitewater. 1990. Basic Books. (written with Benjamin Ginsberg).
Capital of the American Century: The National and International Influence of New York City. 1993. Russell Sage Foundation. (editor).
Political Parties and the State: The American Historical Experience. 1994. Princeton University Press.
Shaped By War and Trade: International Influences on American Political Development. 2002. Princeton University Press. (edited with Ira Katznelson).

References

American political scientists
Cornell University faculty
Cornell University alumni
Harvard University alumni
Harvard University faculty
University of Chicago faculty
Living people
1943 births